Roger Lee Steele (12 June 1945 – 4 August 2012). Raised in Wichita Falls, Texas, Steele was an American-born graphic artist/printmaker living in South Carolina best known for his evocative and colorful  lithography, an artistic process also known as relief printing.  He was a printmaker specializing in the color-blend or split fountain technique often incorporating traditional chine-collé gold leaf techniques in his work. His abstract color graphics are frequently suggestive of an artistic link between mid-late Japanese motifs and the modern world.

Biography 

As an exchange student at Tokyo’s Sophia University, Steele studied graphic art and painting and was strongly attracted to the culture and artistic aesthetic of the late Edo period and early Meiji period.  His studies at Sophia made a lasting impression and continued to inform his work throughout his life.   Steele completed his studies at Texas Christian University, graduating in 1974 with a Master's degree in Fine Arts.

Eventually, his style came to strongly feature late period Japanese elements and techniques, evoking the “floating world” of the 18th and 19th centuries.  His highly recognizable, occasionally “militaristic” approach was developed over decades to its current status as a point of reference for the genre.   He was considered a master of abstract color relief lithography with a considerable following among those knowledgeable in this field.  His earliest works featured landscape vistas fused with broadly martial representations, alternatively peaceful, then vaguely soldierly and even bellicose in composition.

Throughout his career, Steele played an active role in art education both as an educator and as a lecturer and curator, maintaining affiliations with the University of South Carolina, the Southern Graphics Council, American Print Alliance, and the World Print Council.  He was a significant contributor to the Southern Graphics Council International, with service to that organization spanning nearly forty years.  He held nearly every position on the board and continued to be artistically active up to his death in 2012.  His works are to be found in a number of permanent museum and corporate collections as well as in private hands.  His life and art were celebrated from March–April 2013 in an exhibition of his whimsical Valentine Collection at THE Fine Art Gallery, Milwaukee, Wisconsin.  Steele's contributions to the educational community of his hometown of Beaufort, South Carolina were the subject of a posthumous tribute in the Hilton Head Island News, February 2–8, 2017.

Affiliations 

Southern Graphics Council:  Treasurer (1978-1980), SC Representative at Large (2002-2004), Vice President for Internal Affairs (2004-2006), Curator of the Traveling Exhibition (2006-2009)
American Print Alliance
World Print Council
Southeastern College Art Conference
South Carolina Arts Commission

Exhibitions 

Prints by Robert Steele-Special Exhibition, The Fine Art Gallery LLC, Milwaukee, WI, March–April 2013
Southern Graphics Council Traveling Exhibition 2006-2009
Corcoran Museum School of Art, Washington, DC 2005
Mason Gross School of the Arts, Rutgers, New Brunswick, NJ 2004
Expect the Unexpected:  Charles Street Gallery, Dec, 2003. Beaufort, SC
Revolutions and Representation, Boston University, Boston, Ma 2003
Steele on Paper:  Charles Street Gallery, Dec, 2002, Beaufort, SC
The History and Techniques of Printmaking (Traveling exhibition) McMaster Gallery, USC, Columbia, SC 2002
Fresh Paint:  USCB, May, 2002
Print Gumbo, New Orleans, La 2002
Border Crossings, University of Texas, Austin, 2001
Edo Vision:  Converse College, Spartanburg, SC, May, 1999
Edo Vision:  USCB, Jan, 1999
Southern Graphics Council Traveling Show:  1998-2001
Exchange Portfolio Exhibition, University of Tennessee, Knoxville, 1995
Portfolio Exhibition, Texas Christian University, Fort Worth, 1994
Emergency Art Call:  Beaufort Memorial Hospital, 1992
Piccolo Spoleto:  Charleston, SC, 1991
National Works on Paper: University of Mississippi, 1990
Gibbes Art Museum, Charleston, SC, 1989
Columbia College, Columbia, SC, 1988
16 South Carolina Printmakers, Furman University, Greenville, SC, 1988
Invitational:  Century Center, Charlotte, NC, 1987
Colorblend USA:  Texas Tech, Lubbock, Texas, 1987
Beaufort Art Association Spring show, Beaufort, SC, 1985
Hyde-Malone Corporation Traveling Exhibition, 1985-1986
NCNB Corporation Traveling Exhibition, 1985-1987
2nd Regional Lauren Rogers Library and Museum of Art Competition, Laurel, Mississippi, 1984
National Print Competition 79:  Edinboro, State College, Pa.
Spokane National 1979 Works on/with PAPER
A3A Gallery, Savannah, Ga., 1979
Wash Art 79, 4th International Art Fair, Washington, DC
Comparisons and Contrasts 1980-1982:  Exchange exhibition between Printmakers of the Soviet Union and Southern US Juror:  Fritz Eichenberg
Artistic Sass:  Hilton Head Island, SC, 1981
Colorprint USA:  Texas Tech, Lubbock, Texas, 1983
Kate Skipworth Museum, University of Mississippi, 1979
McKissick Museum, USC, Columbia, SC, 1978
Stockton National 1978: Stockton, Ca.  Juror:  Henry Hopkins
Colorprint USA:  Texas Tech, Lubbock, Texas, 1978 Juror:  Warrington Colescott
Works of Art on Paper/Clay:  Memphis State University, 1978 Juror:  Garo Antreasian
National Juried ColorBlend Exhibition:  Georgia Southern College, Statesboro, Ga., 1978 Jurors:  Dr. Tom Dewey and Bernard E.  Solomon
Charlotte Printmakers Society 2nd Annual Print Exhibition: Charlotte, NC, 1978 Juror:  Robert A. Nelson
Image South Gallery, Atlanta, Ga., 1977
Foxgrape Gallery, Hilton Head Island, SC, 1977
Armstrong College, Savannah, Ga., 1977
Nine South Carolina Printmakers:  The Gallery, Spartanburg, SC, 1976
Western Kentucky University, Bowling Green, Ky., 1976
Georgia College, Milledgeville, Ga., 1976
Stetson University, DeLand, Fla., 1975
University of Northern Iowa, Cedar Falls, Ia., 1975
Minot State College, Minot, ND, 1975
Kirkwood Community College, Cedar Rapids, Ia., 1975
South Carolina Arts Commission Invitational: Clemson, SC, 1975 Juror:  Jack Perlmutter
USCB, Beaufort, SC, 1975
Texas College Art Show:  Mountain View College, Dallas, Tx. 1974 Juror:  Edmund Burke Feldman
Young Texas Printmakers:  Dallas, Tx., 1974
TCU Art Exhibition, Fort Worth, Tx., 1974 Juror:  William Wiman
Texas Fine Arts Association Regional Show:  Fort Worth, Tx, 1974 Juror:  Chris Goble
Tyler Museum of Fine Art, Tyler, Tx., 1974
19th National Invitational Print Exhibition:  Brooklyn Museum, NY, 1974
Wichita Falls Museum and Art Center, Wichita Falls, Tx, 1974
Mount Holyoke College National Prints and Drawings Competition: South Hadley, Ma, 1974 Jurors:  Alfred Leslie and Robert Mallary
Purdue University, West LaFayette, In., 1974
DePauw University, Greencastle, In., 1974

References 

1945 births
2012 deaths
People from Fort Smith, Arkansas
American printmakers
Sophia University alumni
Texas Christian University alumni